Rexford may refer to:


Places in the United States
 Rexford, Kansas
 Rexford, Montana
 Rexford, New York

People

Given name
 Rex Cherryman (Rexford Raymond Cherryman, 1886–1921), American actor
 Rexford Tugwell (1891–1971), American economist
 Rexford Burns, Graphic artist

Surname
 Bill Rexford (1927–1994), American racing driver
 Eben E. Rexford (1848–1916), American songwriter
 Jennifer Rexford, American computer scientist
 Roswell B. Rexford, Michigan politician
 Samuel Rexford (1776–1857), New York politician

Masculine given names